Leeroy Anton Matesanz (born 4 May 1985) is a French former footballer.

Career statistics

Club

Notes

References

1985 births
Living people
French footballers
Association football midfielders
Challenger Pro League players
Singapore Premier League players
Olympique Lyonnais players
FC Rouen players
Lyon La Duchère players
Union Royale Namur Fosses-La-Ville players
Étoile FC players
French expatriate footballers
Expatriate footballers in Spain
French expatriate sportspeople in Spain
Expatriate footballers in Belgium
French expatriate sportspeople in Belgium
Expatriate footballers in Singapore
French expatriate sportspeople in Singapore
Footballers from Lyon